Visschershoek is an old farmhouse in the Dutch province of South Holland. The farmhouse is located nearby the lighthouse of Ouddorp, about 7 kilometers from the centre of Ouddorp, next to the dunes on the far western part of the island and municipality of Goeree-Overflakkee.

References

External links
 Photos of the farmhouse
 The farmhouse on Google Streetview

Populated places in South Holland
Goeree-Overflakkee